Ivana Kováčová (born ) is a former Slovak female artistic gymnast and member of the national team.

She participated at the 2008 Summer Olympics. She also competed at world championships, including the 2009 World Artistic Gymnastics Championships in London, Great Britain.

References

External links
Ivana Kovacova at Sports Reference
http://www.gymnastics.sk/wiw/kovacovaivana.html
http://www.gymnastics.sk/2008/kovacova.html
http://www.gettyimages.com.au/photos/ivana-kovacova?excludenudity=true&sort=mostpopular&mediatype=photography&phrase=ivana%20kovacova
https://www.youtube.com/watch?v=I_ApEZ9duvM

1992 births
Living people
Slovak female artistic gymnasts
Sportspeople from Bratislava
Gymnasts at the 2008 Summer Olympics
Olympic gymnasts of Slovakia